The Colony of Lies is a BBC Books original novel written by Colin Brake and based on the long-running British science fiction television series Doctor Who. It features the Second Doctor, Zoe and Jamie. It also features appearances by the Seventh Doctor and Ace, with the Seventh Doctor meeting the Second in a virtual interface to pass on a vital message that will allow him to resolve the current crisis.

Plot

The independent Earth Colony Axista Four was supposedly founded in the 2439 by Stewart Ransom, a noted humanitarian. Arriving on the colony one hundred years later, the Doctor, Zoe and Jamie find a near-civil war.

'Realists' have abandoned Ransome's 'back to basics' ideals and are raiding the remains of the colony ship to further their technological advancements. The 'Loyalists' are in danger of extinction. In a little-known underground bunker, aliens who claim to be the planet's first colonists are stirring.

Hopeful colonists hope Random's daughter, Kirann, can be revived from cryogenic suspension and reunited the colony. This does not work out as expected.

External links
The Cloister Library - The Colony of Lies

2003 British novels
2003 science fiction novels
Past Doctor Adventures
Second Doctor novels
Novels by Colin Brake
BBC Books books
Novels set on fictional planets
Seventh Doctor novels